Ningbo Cixi Stadium (Simplified Chinese: 宁波慈溪体育场) is a multi-use stadium in Cixi, Ningbo, China.  It is currently used mostly for football matches.  The stadium holds 16,000 people.

Footnotes

Football venues in China
Sports venues in Zhejiang